Ocean Beach may refer to:
Ocean Beach, Monmouth County, New Jersey
Ocean Beach, Ocean County, New Jersey